Isoxazolidine is the organic compound with the formula (CH2)3(NH)O. It is the parent of a family of compounds called Isoxazolidines, which are saturated C3NO heterocyclic rings where the nitrogen and oxygen occupy adjacent positions (1 and 2). They are the saturated analogues of Isoxazoles, and they are isomeric with oxazolidines, where the N and O are separated by one carbon.

Isoxazolidines can be produced by the nitrone-olefin (3+2) cycloaddition reaction.

They represent precursors to 1,3-aminoalcohols.  The series Organic Syntheses provides detailed procedures that yield isoxazolidines, e.g., from styrene and N-phenylmaleimide.  Some isoxazolidines are of medicinal interest.

References